Julio César Hernández (born 6 October 1951) is a Venezuelan footballer. He played in three matches for the Venezuela national football team from 1979 to 1981. He was also part of Venezuela's squad for the 1979 Copa América tournament.

References

1951 births
Living people
Venezuelan footballers
Venezuela international footballers
Place of birth missing (living people)
Association football forwards
Estudiantes de Mérida players